"Not Supposed to Sing the Blues" is the first single released from the Swedish rock band Europe's ninth studio album, Bag of Bones. It was released as a digital download on March 9, 2012.

Music video
The music video was directed by Patric Ullaeus and it was premiered on Europe's official website on March 22, 2012.

Track listing
 "Not Supposed to Sing the Blues" – 5:13

Personnel
Joey Tempest – vocals
John Norum – guitars
John Levén – bass
Mic Michaeli – keyboards
Ian Haugland – drums
Kevin Shirley – producer

References

2012 singles
Europe (band) songs
Song recordings produced by Kevin Shirley
2012 songs
Songs written by Joey Tempest
Music videos directed by Patric Ullaeus